German submarine U-306 was a Type VIIC U-boat of Nazi Germany's Kriegsmarine during World War II. The submarine was laid down on 16 September 1941 at the Flender Werke yard at Lübeck as yard number 306, launched on 29 August 1942 and commissioned on 21 October under the command of Oberleutnant Claus von Trotha.

During her career, the U-boat sailed on five combat patrols, sinking one ship and damaging two others, before she was sunk on 31 October 1943 in mid-Atlantic, northwest of the Azores by British warships.

She was a member of three wolfpacks.

Design
German Type VIIC submarines were preceded by the shorter Type VIIB submarines. U-306 had a displacement of  when at the surface and  while submerged. She had two shafts and two  propellers.

U-306 was fitted with five  torpedo tubes (four fitted at the bow and one at the stern), fourteen torpedoes, one  SK C/35 naval gun, 220 rounds, and two twin  C/30 anti-aircraft guns. The boat had a complement of between forty-four and sixty.

Service history
The boat's service life began with training with the 8th U-boat Flotilla on 21 October 1942. She was then transferred to the 1st flotilla for operations on 1 March 1943.

First patrol
The submarine's first patrol began with her departure from Kiel on 25 February 1943. On 22 April she sank the Amerika south of Cape Farewell, Greenland. The next day she damaged the Silvermaple. She arrived in Brest in occupied France, on 9 May.

Second and third patrols
U-306s second foray was relatively uneventful; starting in Brest, it took her as far south as Guinea-Bissau. Off the Gambia, she damaged the Kaipara on 16 July 1943. The boat then docked in Lorient on 11 August.

Her third sortie was rather brief, lasting between 23 and 24 September 1943.

Fourth patrol
On her fourth patrol, she sailed along the French Atlantic coast toward St. Nazaire.

Fifth patrol and loss
The boat was sunk northwest of the Azores by depth charges dropped from the British destroyer  and the corvette  on 31 October 1943.

Fifty-one men died; there were no survivors.

Summary of raiding history

References

Bibliography

External links

German Type VIIC submarines
U-boats commissioned in 1942
U-boats sunk in 1943
World War II submarines of Germany
1942 ships
Ships built in Lübeck
U-boats sunk by depth charges
Ships lost with all hands
U-boats sunk by British warships
Maritime incidents in October 1943